Anthony Joseph Potrac (21 January 1953 – 2 June 2017) was an English footballer who played professionally for Chelsea and Durban City in the 1970s as a winger.

Career
Potrac joined Chelsea as a youth player, and featured in a pre-season friendly in 1968 against Wealdstone. He played one professional league game, which came against Huddersfield Town in 1972. After leaving Chelsea, he joined South African side Durban City.

Death
On 2 June 2017, Chelsea announced via Twitter that Potrac had died at the age of 64.

References

1953 births
2017 deaths
Australian soccer players
Australian expatriate soccer players
Association football midfielders
Chelsea F.C. players
Durban City F.C. players
Bexley United F.C. players
People from Victoria (Australia)
Australian expatriate sportspeople in England
Australian expatriate sportspeople in South Africa
Expatriate footballers in England
Expatriate soccer players in South Africa